Osian Roberts is a Welsh football coach and former player who was most recently assistant manager at Crystal Palace.

In 2014 he was described in the media as "the most influential man in Welsh football."

Early life
Roberts was born in Anglesey, and was brought up in Bodffordd on the island.

Career
Roberts was a central midfielder, and captained the Welsh Schools side. He played in North Wales for Bangor City, Bethesda Athletic and Llangefni Town, before moving to the United States at the age of 19 after receiving a scholarship to attend Furman University. At Furman, he was named Southern Conference player of the year in 1986 and 1988. He later played in the American Professional Soccer League for the New Mexico Chiles, where he was player-manager.

After returning to Wales, he became Anglesey Football Development Officer in 1991.

In June 2007 Roberts resigned as manager of Porthmadog to take up the position of Football Association of Wales technical director. He has also coached the Wales under-16, Wales under-18 and Wales B teams, as well as helping coach the women's under-17 team. In 2014, he was the subject of documentary series called Byd Pêl-droed Osian Roberts; it was shown on S4C. 

On 21 July 2015, Roberts was promoted to assistant manager of the Wales national team under team manager Chris Coleman. Coleman resigned the manager role in November 2017 and Roberts stated that he wished to become the new national team manager. Roberts was retained as assistant manager following the appointment of Ryan Giggs as Wales manager

On 1 August 2019 it was announced that Roberts had become technical director of the Morocco national team. He resigned in July 2021.

In August 2021 he became assistant manager to Patrick Viera at Crystal Palace. Viera was sacked by Crystal Palace in March 2023 with Roberts and other coaching staff also being released.

References

1960s births
Living people
Welsh footballers
Welsh football managers
Sportspeople from Anglesey
Bangor City F.C. players
Bethesda Athletic F.C. players
New Mexico Chiles players
American Professional Soccer League players
Association football midfielders
Association football coaches
Crystal Palace F.C. non-playing staff
Welsh expatriate footballers
Welsh expatriate football managers
Welsh expatriate sportspeople in the United States
Expatriate soccer players in the United States
Expatriate soccer managers in the United States
British expatriates in Morocco
Expatriate football managers in Morocco
Llangefni Town F.C. players